Thierry Agullo (1945 in Bordeaux – 29 January 1980 in Poitiers), was a French artist.

He is best known for his collections of irons, shoes, and other objects in the sociological art movement of the 1970s.

Biography
As a youth, Thierry Agullo was interested in typography and publishing and had an apprenticeship under Robert Morel at Soleil Noir.

In 1965, he began to collect used irons, which he exhibited for the first time in December 1972 – as well as wallets, purses, and gloves.

In 1971, he also produced typographical compositions, collages, and cut-up texts.

In 1974, he met the artist Pierre Molinier, who became a colleague as well as a close friend.
Their friendship resulted in two series of photographs: L'Indécence, 110 black and white photographs produced as a limited edition book by the À l'Enseigne des Oudins gallery in 1975, and  Thérèse Agullo on the theme of androgyny, created in 1976 just before the suicide of Pierre Molinier.

In 1975, he joined the Collectif d'Art Sociologique which was founded in 1974 by Fred Forest.

In 1979, he was editor of a posthumous collection of poems by Pierre Molinier, Les Orphéons magiques, written between 1946 and 1950.

Written works
 Robinet d'amour (Poems of 1977), Al Dante, 2000 
 Tracts hétéroclite, Al Dante, 2000

Recent exhibitions
 Thierry Agullo, À l'Enseigne des Oudins Gallery, Paris, 1 July-30 September 2000.
 François Pluchart – l'art, un acte de participation au monde, Fonds régional d'art contemporain in Bourgogne, 16 November 2002 – 4 January 2003.

Notes

References

External links
 Archivio Conz
 Works of Thierry Agullo on the site of the Musée de l'Objet de Blois

1945 births
1980 deaths
French artists